Vidmantas Vysniauskas (born 15 September 1969) is a Lithuanian former professional footballer who played as a midfielder. As an international, he obtained a two caps for the Lithuania national team. Vysniauskas began his playing career in Ukraine in 1990 with SC Tavriya Simferopol. He moved to Germany in 1992 and played successively for 1. FC Markkleeberg, FC Sachsen Leipzig, SV Wilhelmshaven, Sportfreunde Siegen, VfB Lübeck and FC Schüttorf 09.

Honours
Tavriya Simferopol
 Ukrainian Premier League: 1992

Lithuania
 Baltic Cup: 1992

References

 
 

1969 births
Living people
Soviet footballers
Lithuanian footballers
Association football midfielders
Lithuania international footballers
Soviet First League players
Ukrainian Premier League players
SC Tavriya Simferopol players
1. FC Union Berlin players
FC Sachsen Leipzig players
SV Wilhelmshaven players
Sportfreunde Siegen players
VfB Lübeck players
Lithuanian expatriate footballers
Lithuanian expatriate sportspeople in Germany
Expatriate footballers in Germany
Lithuanian expatriate sportspeople in Ukraine
Expatriate footballers in Ukraine